Valea Cireșului may refer to the following places in Romania:

 Valea Cireșului, a village in the commune Botoroaga, Teleorman County
 Valea Cireșului, a tributary of the Lozna in Caraș-Severin County
 Valea Cireșului, another name for a section of the Gepiu in Bihor County

See also 
 Cireș (disambiguation)
 Cireșu (disambiguation)